Jordanian art has a very ancient history. Some of the earliest figurines, found at Aïn Ghazal, near Amman, have been dated to the Neolithic period. A distinct Jordanian aesthetic in art and architecture emerged as part of a broader Islamic art tradition which flourished from the 7th-century. Traditional art and craft is vested in material culture including mosaics, ceramics, weaving, silver work, music, glass-blowing and calligraphy. The rise of colonialism in North Africa and the Middle East, led to a dilution of traditional aesthetics. In the early 20th-century, following the creation of the independent nation of Jordan, a contemporary Jordanian art movement emerged and began to search for a distinctly Jordanian art aesthetic that combined both tradition and contemporary art forms.

Traditional Art
Jordan, as an independent nation was founded in 1924. Prior to that, the area that is now Jordan had been subject to a number of different rules. It was part of the Nabatean Kingdom, under Hellenistic rule following Alexander the Great's conquest of the area; under Roman rule in the 1st century BCE, and was once part of the Umayyad Kingdom in the 7th century (CE) and part of the Ottoman Empire from the 15th-century until the end of World War I when it became a British protectorate until the time of independence. Its art is part a broader Islamic artistic tradition, with evidence of classical influences.

Traditional art was often based on material culture including hand-crafts such as rug-making, basket weaving, silver smithing, mosaics, ceramics, and glass-blowing. The Bedouins were largely self-sufficient in the production of goods, and made their own rugs, wove baskets and prepared ceramics. Such works exhibited wide variation in styles, as tribes often used their own tribal motifs.

The Jordanian art historian, Wijdan Ali has argued that the traditional Islamic aesthetic evident in craft-based work was displaced by the arrival of colonialism in North Africa and the Middle East. However, in the decolonised period of the 20th-century, a contemporary art form combining tradition and modern influences can be observed.

Pre-Islamic art

As early as the Neolithic period in Jordan, figurines and sculptures were being made. In some of the earliest examples, human skulls were built up with plaster, and inlays were used for the eye sockets. Two caches of figurines discovered at Aïn Ghazal, near Amman, include animal models and some three dozen monumental figurines (pictured below), which scholars believe were important to the ritual and social structure of the peoples living there, and may have formed part of a burial ritual. The 'Ain Ghazal statues are very large, with some around three feet in height. Aïn Ghazal was occupied between 7,000 BCE and 5,000 BCE and the statues have been dated to around 6,500 BCE. Showing extensive use of plaster, the Aïn Ghazal statues represent a clear departure from the tiny, faceless figures of the Paleolithic period and mark the dawn of a distinct Neolithic art.

The Nabateans incorporated numerous sculpted panels, figurines and decorative friezes into their buildings at Petra and made pottery. Examples include the architectural detail used on the temple of Qsr al-Bint at Petra Dura along with these young artists helped to spark a local, Jordanian art movement.

Muhanna Dura ultimately taught painting and art history at the Teachers' Training College in Ammman and in 1964, established the Fine Arts Section at the Department of Culture and Art, Amman, and also established the Jordan Institute of Fine Arts in 1970. Thus, he inspired a generation of young artists. Among his notable students were the Princess Wijdan Ali who is best known for her attempts to revive the traditions of Islamic art. and Nawal Abdallah, who is one of the leading lights of Jordan's contemporary arts scene and whose art often includes calligraphy.

A second group of artists, who trained in Europe and America in the 1960s, returned to Jordan and began to search for a distinctive Jordanian artistic expression and to assert their Arab identity. Notable artists in the Jordanian art movement include: Khalid Khreis (b. 1955); Nabil Shehadeh (b. 1949); Yasser Duwaik (b. 1940); Mahmoud Taha (b. 1942) and Aziz Amoura (b. 1944).

Hurufiyah art movement

The Hurufiyah Art Movement (also known as the Al-hurufiyyah movement or the North African Letterist movement) refers to the use of calligraphy as a graphic form within an artwork. From around 1955, artists working in North Africa and parts of Asia transformed Arabic calligraphy into a modern art movement. The use of calligraphy in modern art arose independently in various Islamic states; few of these artists had knowledge of each other, allowing for different manifestations of hurufiyyah to emerge in different regions. In Sudan, for instance, artworks include both Islamic calligraphy and West African motifs. 

Hurufiyah artists rejected Western art concepts, and instead searched for a new artistic identity drawn from within their own culture and heritage. These artists successfully integrate Islamic visual traditions, especially calligraphy, into contemporary, indigenous compositions. Although hurufiyah artists were concerned with their individual dialogue with nationalism and attempted to engage with the modern art movement, they also worked towards an aesthetic that transcended national boundaries and represented a broader affiliation with an Islamic identity.

Jordan's most notable exponents of hurufiyyah art are the ceramicist, Mahmoud Taha and the artist and art historian, Princess Wijdan Ali who through her writing has been able to bring the art movement to the attention of a broader audience.

Art galleries and museums

 Jordan National Gallery of Fine Arts 
 Jabal Luwiebdeh Art Museum
 Khalid Shoman Foundation, Darat al Funun 
 Dar Al-Anda, Amman - a museum and research centre 
 Foresight32 Art Gallery, Amman
 Nabad, Amman 
 Wadi Finan, Amman 
 Orfali Gallery, Um Uthaina
 Orient Gallery, Abdoun, West Amman
 Jacaranda, Amman 
 Cairo Amman Bank Gallery, Wadi Saqra, Amman

See also

 Calligraphy
 Desert castles
 Islamic art
 Islamic architecture
 Islamic calligraphy
 Jordan National Gallery of Fine Arts
 List of Orientalist artists
 List of Jordanians
 Osman Waqialla
 Umayyad architecture

Notable historic architectural sites 

 Jabal al-Qal'a - group of upper-class houses
 Al Qastal, Jordan - Umayyad palace
 Hammam al-Sarah - Umayyad bath-house
 Qasr Amra - Umayyad palace
 Qasr Al-Hallabat - desert castle/ hunting lodge
 Qasr Al-Kharanah - desert castle
 Qasr Al-Mshatta -desert castle
 Qasr Burqu' -desert castle
 Qasr Tuba - desert castle

References

Further reading
 Piotr Bienkowski, Treasures from an Ancient Land: The Art of Jordan,  A. Sutton Publishing, 1994, 1996 
 Peter Vine, Jewels of the Kingdom: The Heritage of Jordan, Immel, 1987

External links 
 Sculptures by Anees Maani
 Paintings by Hani Alqam
 Prints by Juman Nimri
 The Embassy of the Hashemite Kingdom of Jordan: Culture and Religion

 
Islamic art by country
Jordanian artists
Jordan